The 2017 Koblenz Open was a professional tennis tournament played on indoor hard courts. It was the first edition of the tournament which was part of the 2017 ATP Challenger Tour. It took place in Koblenz, Germany between 17 and 22 January 2017.

Singles main-draw entrants

Seeds

 1 Rankings are as of January 9, 2017.

Other entrants
The following players received wildcards into the singles main draw:
  Florian Broska
  Jan Choinski
  Benjamin Hassan
  Daniel Masur

The following player received entry into the singles main draw with a protected ranking:
  Cedrik-Marcel Stebe

The following players received entry into the singles main draw as alternates:
  Guido Andreozzi
  Grégoire Barrère
  Yannick Mertens

The following players received entry from the qualifying draw:
  Filip Horanský
  Nils Langer
  Yann Marti
  Michał Przysiężny

The following players received entry into the singles main draw as lucky losers:
  Adrien Bossel
  Adrian Ungur

Champions

Singles

 Ruben Bemelmans def.  Nils Langer 6–4, 3–6, 7–6(7–0).

Doubles

 Hans Podlipnik /  Andrei Vasilevski def.  Roman Jebavý /  Lukáš Rosol 7–5, 3–6, [16–14].

External links
 Official website

Koblenz Open
2017
2017 in German tennis